Elliot Newman is a British visual effects artist. He was nominated for an Academy Award in the category Best Visual Effects for the film The Lion King.

Selected filmography 
 The Lion King (2019; co-nominated with Robert Legato, Adam Valdez and Andrew R. Jones)

References

External links 

Living people
Place of birth missing (living people)
Year of birth missing (living people)
Visual effects artists
Visual effects supervisors